Shuruaat Ka Interval is a 2014 Indian collaborative feature film directed by a team of eight filmmakers including Aarti S. Bagdi, Amrit Raj Gupta, Atanu Mukherjee, Ankit Tripathi, Krishan Hooda, Palash Vaswani, Rukshana Tabassum, Shishir Jha.

PVR Director's Rare & Humaramovie presented the short film anthology Shuruaat Ka Interval, which includes 8 shorts from various filmmakers, chosen and mentored by filmmakers Imtiaz Ali, Vikramaditya Motwane, Anand Gandhi & Vikas Bahl. All the films are based on one theme: Interval, which has been interpreted in a different, unique way by each filmmaker.

Cast
 Sayani Gupta
 Jitendra Kumar
 Anil Mange
 Jim Sarbh
 Shivankit Parihar
 Rohan Shah
 Namya Saxena
 Sundip Ved

References

2010s Hindi-language films
Indian avant-garde and experimental films
2010s avant-garde and experimental films